Whittington may refer to:

Places
 Whittington, Victoria, Australia
 Whittington, Illinois, United States

England
 Old Whittington, Derbyshire
 New Whittington, Derbyshire
 Whittington Moor, Derbyshire
 Whittington, Gloucestershire
 Whittington, Lancashire
 Whittington, Northumberland, a civil parish containing Great Whittington
 Whittington, Shropshire
 Whittington, South Staffordshire, a location
 Whittington, Stafford, a location
 Whittington, Staffordshire, near Lichfield
 Whittington, Warwickshire, a location
 Whittington, Worcestershire

Railways stations in England
 Whittington railway station, in Derbyshire
 Whittington High Level railway station, in Shropshire
 Whittington Low Level railway station, in Shropshire

Other uses
 Whittington (surname)
 Whittington (novel), by Alan Armstrong
 Whittington (opera) (1874) by Jacques Offenbach
 Whittington Hospital in London, England

See also